Lance Gerard Woolaver (born 1948) is a Canadian author, poet, playwright, lyricist, and director. His best-known works include books, film and biographical plays about Canadian folk artist Maud Lewis, including Maud Lewis The Heart on the Door, and Maud Lewis - World Without Shadows. His plays include one about international singer Portia White, who was born in Nova Scotia: Portia White - First You Dream.

Biography

Early life

Woolaver was born in Digby County, Nova Scotia, in 1948. He attended Acadia and Dalhousie universities in Nova Scotia, and the Sorbonne in Paris. 

As a child, Woolaver had seen Maud and Everett Lewis, and their tiny painted house. He noticed tourists stopping to buy paintings, but kept his distance from these local characters. However, he was later inspired to pitch an article on Maud Lewis to Chatelaine magazine.  The article was accepted on the condition that Woolaver co-write it with a female author. He wrote with his mother, and the resulting article, "The Joyful Art of Maud Lewis," published in December 1975, was purchased for $700, a sum he considered "a fortune" at the time. This enabled and encouraged him to devote time to writing. He later wrote a book and two plays about Maud Lewis.

Woolaver published earlier stories in the 1970s in Canadian literary magazines, including the Wascana Review (which ceased publication in 2012) and The Fiddlehead.

Marriage and family
Woolaver lives in Halifax with his wife, Martha (Spencer) of Saskatoon. They married in 1967, and have two children, and two grandchildren. Woolaver enjoys flyfishing in the Canadian Rockies, and on the Margaree River in Cape Breton Island.

Literary career

Woolaver wrote the book The Illuminated Life of Maud Lewis (1996), with photographs by Bob Brooks. It was awarded the Dartmouth Book Award and the Atlantic Booksellers Award. It was adapted as a film of the same name (with screenplay by Woolaver) that aired on Canadian VisionTV in 1998. The film was directed by Peter d'Entremont and produced by Triad Film Productions and the National Film Board of Canada.

Woolaver's play Maud Lewis - World Without Shadows has been produced by professional and community theatres, including Neptune Theatre (Halifax), King’s Theatre of Annapolis Royal and Ship’s Company Theatre of Parrsboro in Nova Scotia, and the Blyth Festival of Ontario. It was also adapted and produced as a CBC Radio national broadcast. 

His play The Poor Farm, was produced at the Chester Playhouse under the direction of Christopher Heide of Mahone Bay. It was the first play in Nova Scotia to engage actors of Mi’kmaq, White, Black and Acadian heritage in the same production. It dealt with the politics of poverty and the system of provincial poor farms. 

Woolaver's collection of Christmas songs, The Noel Cantata, was recently produced in Norway.  

His young adult novel The Outlaw League (1991) was adapted for film, and he wrote the screenplay. Based in his hometown, it was shot in Restigouche, New Brunswick. It was produced in Montreal as La Gang des Hors la Loi; it won the Vancouver Reel to Real Film Festival in 2015. 

His play Portia White - First You Dream, about Portia White, a Nova Scotia native and Canada's first black singer to win international acclaim, has been produced by several theaters, including the Victoria Playhouse in Petrolia, Ontario.

His newest novel, The Halflife of Evil, will be published by Spencer Books in June 2018. It is about Maud Lewis, the provincial Poor Farm, and the policies of imprisonment of the poor.

Maud Lewis
Woolaver is best known for his works on the life and art of Maud Lewis. He wrote a picture book of Maud’s life, The Illuminated Life of Maud Lewis (1996), with photographs of Maud and her works by Bob Brooks. It has been in continuous print since being published. The cover image of Maud Lewis in the sunny corner of her tiny house has been recognized as a classic portrait, said to rank with the work of Yousuf Karsh. 

Maud Lewis - World Without Shadows, his play about Maud Lewis and her husband Everett Lewis, has been produced across Canada and broadcast by CBC radio.  It tells of Maud’s struggle against juvenile rheumatoid arthritis, and triumph as an artist, despite poverty. Canadian actor Nicola Lipman played Maud to great acclaim in the 1990s Ship’s Company Theatre and Neptune Theatre productions.

His play The Return of Her Child deals with issues related to the adoption of Maud Lewis's daughter Catherine by Mamie Crosby.

Woolaver's recent full biography, Maud Lewis The Heart on the Door (2016), features another Brooks' portrait of the artist, taken in 1965, in which Lewis appears frightened and fearful. This is appropriate to the darker tone of this work, as Woolaver explores many issues in her life. His account contrasts also with the portrayal of Lewis in the independent feature drama film, Maudie.

The Outlaw League / La Gang des Hors la Loi 

The Outlaw League (1991) is a young adult novel, which Woolaver set in his home town of Digby, Nova Scotia. It explores the role of baseball in bringing the people of the village together. Woolaver refers to childhood friends in his book, and to former Digby baseball teams, including the Digby Ravens, the Bear River Blue Sox, and the Freeport Schooners. 

The novel was adapted as a 2014 film, La Gang des Hors la Loi, produced by Rock Demers of Productions La Fete, from a script by André Melançon, Jean Beaudry, and Woolaver.

Honours and awards
2003, Maud Lewis - World Without Shadows won the Merritt Award as Nova Scotia’s outstanding play.

Books

Woolaver wrote the following:
Maud Lewis The Heart on the Door (2016), Spencer Books,  
The Poor Farm (1999), Charles Press, 
with Bob Brooks, photographer. Maud's Country : Landscapes that Inspired the Art of Maud Lewis (1999), Nimbus Publishing,  |oclc=40534718 
with Bob Brooks, photographer. Christmas with Maud Lewis (1997), Goose Lane Editions,  |oclc=37491578 
with Bob Brooks, and Art Gallery of Nova Scotia. The Illuminated Life of Maud Lewis (1996), Nimbus Publishing,  |oclc=37519347 
with George Dillon Woolaver. Lance Gerard Woolaver's World Without Shadows (1996), Stage Hand,  |oclc=35942224 
with John Burden. The Outlaw League (1991), Nimbus Publishing,  |oclc=22812322 
The Metallic Sparrow (1991), Nimbus Publishing,  |oclc=26852160 
with Anna Gamble. Change of Tide (1982), Nimbus Publishing,  |oclc=158998785 
with Maud Lewis. Christmas with the Rural Mail : a poem (1979), Nimbus Publishing,  |oclc=9750720 
with Maud Lewis. From Ben Loman to the Sea : a poem (1979), Nimbus Publishing,  |oclc=10707547

Plays
His plays include the following:

Brindley Town : a two-hander in three acts (2000), Gaspereau Press, Wolfville, NS  
The Poor Farm 
Lord Strange 
Maud Lewis - World Without Shadows (1996) 
Portia White - First You Dream 
Evelyn Richardson - The Keeping of Lights
Kenny Paul

Children's books

His children's books include the following:

Duck, Duck and Duck 
The Humble Mumbles 
Christmas with the Rural Mail
From Ben Loman to the Sea 
with Anna Gamble, Change of Tide '
with Lee Tanner, Mr. Christmas 
with Lee Tanner, Darwin

Libretto
The Heart on the Door

Songs
Noel Cantata, with Notteroy Church, Norway

Scripts
His film screenplays and radio scripts include the following:

The Poor Farms, Radio Documentary (with Ron Foley MacDonald)
The Illuminated Life of Maud Lewis (1998) 
Maud Lewis - The Heart on the Door
The Outlaw League (produced as La Gang des Hors-la-Loi) 
The Noggins

References

External links
Author Website

  

20th-century Canadian poets
Canadian male poets
20th-century Canadian dramatists and playwrights
21st-century Canadian dramatists and playwrights
Dalhousie University alumni
Acadia University alumni
University of Paris alumni
1948 births
Living people
Canadian male dramatists and playwrights
20th-century Canadian male writers
21st-century Canadian male writers